KUKC-LD, virtual channel 20 (UHF digital channel 14), is a low-powered Univision-affiliated television station licensed to Kansas City, Missouri, United States and serving the Kansas City metropolitan area. The station is owned by Media Vista Group, LLC. KUKC-LD's offices and master control facilities are located on West 31st Street in the Westside South section of Kansas City, Missouri, and its transmitter is located near 27th Street in the city's Western Blue Township section. On cable, the station is available on Charter Spectrum channel 26 and AT&T U-verse channel 48.

Until 2018 when KGKC-LD started carrying Telemundo, KUKC had the distinction of being the only standalone Spanish-language television station in the Kansas City market (KSMO-TV (channel 62) carried MundoMax on its second digital subchannel before that network's shutdown in late November 2016), but is the only Univision network affiliate in the state of Missouri.

History

The station first signed on the air in 1989 as K29CF; it originally operated as an affiliate of the home shopping network ValueVision. To allow full-power outlet KCWB (channel 29, now KCWE) to sign on the air, the station relocated to UHF channel 48 in 1996, and changed its callsign to K48FS. It remained a ValueVision affiliate, however it also carried children's programming during the afternoon hours (such as The Flintstones and Mighty Max).

In 2004, the station was purchased by Equity Media Holdings. Shortly after it was finalized, in January 2005, the station became the market's Univision affiliate; reflecting this, its callsign was changed to KUKC-LP (for "Univision Kansas City"). On December 8, 2008, Equity Media Holdings filed for Chapter 11 bankruptcy protection; it then began to sell off its television station properties. KUKC was sold to SP Television on June 2, 2009. The sale closed on August 17, 2009. SP Television reached a deal to sell KUKC to Media Vista Group on December 21, 2012.

Digital channel

References

External links

Equity Media Holdings
Univision network affiliates
Television stations in the Kansas City metropolitan area
Television channels and stations established in 1989
Spanish-language television stations in Missouri
Spanish-language television stations in Kansas